Taghi Rahmani is an Iranian journalist, writer and nationalist-religious activist.

Shireen Hunter describes Rahmani as "a contemporary Iranian intellectual and author of books on religious intellectualism and reason".

Between 1981 and 2005, he reportedly was sentenced to a total of 5,000 days in prison. According to Reporters Without Borders, he is "Iran’s most frequently jailed journalist" and Amnesty International has designated him a prisoner of conscience.

Rahmani was a senior campaign official for Mehdi Karroubi during 2009 Iranian presidential election.

References

Living people
1959 births
Iranian journalists
Iranian religious-nationalists
Amnesty International prisoners of conscience held by Iran
Iranian expatriates in France
Members of the National Council for Peace